The China national futsal team represents the People's Republic of China in international futsal competition.

Tournament

FIFA Futsal World Cup

AFC Futsal Championship

Futsal at the Asian Indoor and Martial Arts Games

EAFF Futsal Championship

Match

Roster

Following is the squad for the 2018 AFC Futsal Championship.

References

Futsal in China
Futsal
Asian national futsal teams